Chełmy Landscape Park (Park Krajobrazowy Chełmy) is a protected area (Landscape Park) in south-western Poland, established in 1992, covering an area of .

The Park lies within Lower Silesian Voivodeship: in Jawor County (Gmina Bolków, Gmina Męcinka, Gmina Paszowice) and Legnica County (Gmina Krotoszyce).

Within the Landscape Park are four nature reserves.

External links 

Landscape parks in Poland
Parks in Lower Silesian Voivodeship